Stefan Schumacher (born 21 July 1981) is a German former professional road racing cyclist. Schumacher won the bronze medal in the road race at the 2007 UCI Road World Championships, two stages in the 2006 Giro d'Italia and two stages in the 2008 Tour de France. After positive results on doping products in the 2008 Tour de France and the 2008 Summer Olympics, he received a suspension for two years, later reduced by some months. After his suspension, he came back as a professional cyclist before retiring in 2017.

Career
In 2006, he made his UCI ProTour debut with  after posting impressive continental circuits results on the UCI Europe Tour.

Schumacher has been involved in a series of controversial incidents during his career. He was implicated in a doping case in 2005 when he tested positive for an amphetamine. His mother, a doctor, had prescribed an asthma medication after failing to find it on the World Anti-Doping Agency's list of banned substances, and checking with the appropriate Dutch agency. He was cleared by the German Cycling Federation of a doping offence.

Gerolsteiner (2006–08)
Schumacher claimed he had collided first with a spectator and the race jury accepted his story.

Following his third place in the road race at the 2007 UCI Road World Championships in his home town of Stuttgart, Schumacher was arrested for drunken driving. Four months later he revealed that the blood test taken at the time of his arrest had shown traces of amphetamines, whilst denying that he had knowingly taken drugs or had any knowledge of how the positive test had come about. Following a rule change in 2004 amphetamines were no longer on WADA's out-of-competition banned list; as a result the German federation again exonerated him.

Doping suspension
On 6 October 2008 the media reported that Schumacher had tested positive for the controlled substance continuous erythropoietin receptor activator (CERA), a new generation of erythropoietin (EPO), in a blood sample taken during the 2008 Tour de France. CERA was also the drug for which Italian cyclists Riccardo Riccò and Leonardo Piepoli tested positive during the Tour de France.

On 19 February 2009 Schumacher was banned for two years by the Union Cycliste Internationale (UCI). In January 2010, the Court of Arbitration for Sport (CAS) reduced Schumacher's ban, allowing him to ride again as from August 2010.

In April 2009 Schumacher's name was raised in connection with a positive test for performance-enhancing drugs at the 2008 Summer Olympics. Both his "A" and "B" samples tested positive for CERA. Schumacher was disqualified after these positive tests; he appealed against this to CAS, but dropped his appeal in April 2010.

Post-suspension
Schumacher's ban ended in August 2010. He came back to ride for the  team, and joined  for the 2012 season. In March 2013 Schumacher confessed to doping in an interview with the news magazine Der Spiegel. He stated he started doping in his mid-twenties and used "EPO, growth hormone and corticosteroids". He also said that his former team  tolerated doping and it became as banal as "having a plate of pasta after training".

Major results
Source:

2001
 5th Rund um den Henninger Turm U23
2002
 8th Overall Peace Race
1st Young rider classification
 10th Overall Niedersachsen Rundfahrt
1st Young rider classification
2003
 9th Overall Niedersachsen Rundfahrt
2004
 1st Druivenkoers Overijse
 1st Mountains classification, Sachsen Tour
 1st Mountains classification, Rheinland-Pfalz Rundfahrt
 2nd Road race, National Road Championships
 2nd Overall Jadranska Magistrala
1st Mountains classification
 2nd Overall Hessen-Rundfahrt
 3rd Poreč Trophy
 4th GP Triberg-Schwarzwald
 5th Rund um Köln
 8th Rund um Düren
 10th Overall Bayern Rundfahrt
1st Young rider classification
1st Stage 6
2005
 1st  Overall Rheinland-Pfalz Rundfahrt
1st Stages 1, 2, 3 & 4b (ITT)
 1st  Overall Ster Elektrotoer
 1st  Overall Niedersachsen Rundfahrt
 2nd Rund um Köln
 2nd Hel van het Mergelland
 9th Grand Prix Rudy Dhaenens
 9th Veenendaal–Veenendaal
 9th Rund um den Henninger Turm
2006
 1st  Overall Tour de Pologne
1st Stages 6 & 7
 1st  Overall Eneco Tour of Benelux
1st  Young rider classification
1st Prologue
 1st  Overall Circuit Cycliste Sarthe
 Giro d'Italia
1st Stages 3 & 18
Held  after Stages 3–4
 1st Stage 4 (ITT) Sachsen Tour
 6th Rund um den Henninger Turm
 9th Amstel Gold Race
2007
 1st  Overall Bayern Rundfahrt
1st Stage 4 (ITT)
 1st Amstel Gold Race
 3rd  Road race, UCI Road World Championships
 4th Overall Tirreno–Adriatico
1st Stage 5 (ITT)
2008
 1st Stage 4 (ITT) Bayern Rundfahrt
 Tour de France
1st Stages 4 (ITT) & 20 (ITT)
 2nd Time trial, National Road Championships
 3rd GP Triberg-Schwarzwald
2011
 Vuelta a Asturias
1st Stages 1 & 2b (ITT)
 3rd Grand Prix of Aargau Canton
 4th Overall Vuelta a la Comunidad de Madrid
 4th Overall Tour of Azerbaijan (Iran)
1st Prologue & Stage 5
 7th Coppa Sabatini
 8th Overall Settimana Internazionale di Coppi e Bartali
 9th Giro dell'Appennino
 10th Coppa Città di Stresa, Gran Premio Nobili Rubinetterie
2012
 1st  Overall Tour of China II
1st Prologue & Stage 4 (ITT)
 1st  Overall Tour de Serbie
1st Stage 3
 2nd Overall Szlakiem Grodów Piastowskich
 2nd Overall Tour of China I
1st Stage 1 (TTT)
 3rd Overall Tour de San Luis
 5th Rogaland GP
 7th Tallinn–Tartu GP
 8th Overall Danmark Rundt
 8th Ronde van Drenthe
2013
 3rd Time trial, National Road Championships
 3rd Overall Tour d'Algérie
1st Stage 1
 3rd Overall Tour of Estonia
 5th Overall Tour de Blida
 6th Overall Szlakiem Grodów Piastowskich
 7th Overall Sibiu Cycling Tour
1st Stage 3a (ITT)
2014
 1st Stage 3 (ITT) Szlakiem Grodów Piastowskich
 1st Stage 3 (ITT) Tour de Beauce
2015
 3rd Time trial, National Road Championships
 8th Overall Czech Cycling Tour
2016
 1st  Overall Tour du Maroc
 9th Overall Tour of Iran (Azerbaijan)
 9th Gran Premio della Costa Etruschi

Notes

References

External links

 
 
 
 

1981 births
Living people
People from Ostfildern
Sportspeople from Stuttgart (region)
German male cyclists
German Giro d'Italia stage winners
German Tour de France stage winners
Cyclists at the 2008 Summer Olympics
Olympic cyclists of Germany
Doping cases in cycling
Cyclists from Baden-Württemberg
German sportspeople in doping cases
Tour of Azerbaijan (Iran) winners